The abbreviation BCSO may refer to:
Baker County Sheriff's Office (Florida)
Baltimore County Sheriff's Office (Maryland)
Bernalillo County Sheriff's Office
Bexar County Sheriff's Office
Boone County Sheriff's Office (Kentucky)
Bradley County Sheriff's Office
Brazoria County Sheriff's Office
Broome County Sheriff's Office
Broward County Sheriff's Office